This was a parliamentary by-election for the British House of Commons constituency of Northampton.

Previous MP 
The sitting Conservative MP, Sir Arthur Holland died on 7 December 1927, causing a by-election. He had been the MP here since 1924, when he gained the seat from Labour.

Electoral history 
The Liberal party lost the seat in 1923 and at the 1924 election, the seat became a Labour/Conservative marginal.

Candidates 
The Conservative candidate selected to defend the seat was A.F.G. Renton, who had come second at Leeds West in the 1924 general election.
The defeated Labour MP from 1924, Margaret Bondfield was elected MP for Wallsend in the 1926 by-election, so Labour had to find a new candidate. They selected Cecil L'Estrange Malone. In the 1918 general election, Malone was elected as the Coalition Liberal MP for Leyton East. Around 1919-20 he became a Communist and stood down from parliament prior to the 1922 general election. He unsuccessfully stood as the Labour candidate for Ashton-under-Lyne at the 1924 general election.
The Liberal candidate, Sydney Cope Morgan had not contested the last election. 
A fourth candidate entered the contest in the figure of a 53-year-old Manchester baker, E.A. Hailwood. He had also stood as an Independent Conservative candidate at the 1927 Southend by-election, coming fourth. He put himself forward as a candidate protesting against Baldwin's lack of leadership as Prime Minister.

Campaign
The appeal of Augustine Hailwood was made principally on the issue of trade. He called for the introduction of protective tariffs which he argued would benefit the local shoe and boot industry.

Result 

Hailwood had taken just enough votes off the official Conservative candidate to enable Labour to win.

Aftermath 
Neither Morgan nor Hailwood contested the 1929 general election. However, L'Estrange and Renton faced each other again.

References

1928 elections in the United Kingdom
1928 in England
By-elections to the Parliament of the United Kingdom in Northamptonshire constituencies
Politics of Northampton
20th century in Northamptonshire